John Michael Godar  (October 25, 1864 – June 23, 1949), was a professional baseball player who played as an outfielder in the Major Leagues for the 1892 Baltimore Orioles.

External links

1864 births
1949 deaths
Baltimore Orioles (NL) players
Major League Baseball outfielders
Baseball players from Ohio
19th-century baseball players
Hot Springs Blues players
St. Joseph Reds players
Houston Babies players
Houston Red Stockings players
Galveston Giants players
Dallas Tigers players
Galveston Sand Crabs players
Sacramento Senators players
Oakland Colonels players
Cedar Rapids Canaries players
Quincy Ravens players
Mansfield Electricians players
Birmingham Bluebirds players
Mobile Blackbirds players